Piney Flats is an unincorporated community in Sullivan County in the U.S. state of Tennessee. It is part of the Kingsport–Bristol (TN)–Bristol (VA) Metropolitan Statistical Area, which is a component of the Johnson City–Kingsport–Bristol, TN-VA Combined Statistical Area – commonly known as the "Tri-Cities" region. Some areas of Piney Flats along U.S. Route 11E have been annexed by Johnson City (south of the Allison Road and Piney Flats Road intersection) and Bluff City north of the intersection and areas along Allison Road & Piney Flats Road.  The ZIP Code for Piney Flats is 37686.

The name of the town evidently comes from the flat terrain of the valley and the pine trees that grew there. Oliver Taylor in his book "Historic Sullivan" describes the different types of hunters who roamed the area when it was settled by white people. There were the "transient hunters" who hunted in groups, the "still hunters" who hunted alone, the "round-up hunters," and "fire hunters." "The hunts were especially directed against wolves. Sometimes more than one hundred men would engage in the round-up. They would encircle a large boundary of land and drive the animals toward the center, gradually closing in upon them and giving but little chance of escape. In this way, Piney Flats got its name. For a long time that section was infested with packs of vicious and destructive wolves – which were made bolder by the veneration of the Indians for them – and the neighborhood hunters, agreeing upon a 'meet,' would name 'the [piney] flats.'"

Geography

Education

Piney Flats has an elementary and middle school named "Mary Hughes School." The school operates under the Sullivan County Board of Education and educates students from kindergarten to eighth grade. Upon completion at Mary Hughes, students will enter high school at Sullivan East High School.

See also
Rocky Mount State Historic Site

References

External links
 

Unincorporated communities in Sullivan County, Tennessee
Unincorporated communities in Tennessee
Kingsport–Bristol metropolitan area